Koduvally is a Major Municipal town in Kozhikode district. Koduvally is known as the city of gold . It is located on the Calicut-Wayanad National Highway 212 (NH 766) and is about 22 km northeast of Kozhikode (Calicut) city. Koduvally Municipality is a Newly Converted 3rd grade Municipality form Koduvally Grama Panchayat with effect from 01.11.2015, Koduvally Municipality have 36 Wards or Divisions. The main local towns in this municipality are Vavad, Nellamkandi, Koduvally West, Koduvally East,  Koduvally Town, South Koduvally, Vennakkad, Thalapperumanna, Karuvanpoyil, Kareettiparamba, Manipuram And Kalaranthiri. The nearest  local bodies are Kizhakkoth (West), Madavoor (West), Omassery (East), Kunnamangalam (South) and Thamarassery (North).Smt. Shareefa Kannadippoyil is the first chairperson of the koduvally municipality and Sri. A.P Majeed master is the first deputy chairperson of the koduvally municipality.

Revenue Villages 

 Vavad
 Koduvally
 Puthoor (Partially)

Head of the Municipality 

List of Chairperons

List of Secretaries

Landmarks
Koduvally Municipality contains a mini stadium, a branch of State Bank of India, the Federal Bank, Canara bank, Syndicate Bank for ATMs. a police station, Koduvally Muslim Orphanage, the KMO Arts and Science College and the Phoenix Pain and Palliative Care Society. A mini civil station, which was inaugurated on 2012 by Hon Chief Minister Oommen Chandy in the presence of Hon Industries minister PK Kunhalikutty is situated at the heart of Koduvally.

Educational Institutions 
Koduvally Municipality having a wide range of Educational Institution in the heart of city in within short distance having Worlds famous Technical & management institutions .

Govt Sector 

 - CH Muhammed Koya Memorial Govt Arts & Science Collage, Koduvally
 - Govt. ITI, Koduvally
 - Govt Higher secondary School, Koduvally 
 - Govt Higher secondary School, Karuvanpoyil
 - GMUP School Vennakkad
 - GMUP School Kalarathiri
 - GMLP School Koduvally
 - GMLP School Vavad
 - GMLP School Thalapperumanna

Aided Sector 

 - AUP School Manipuram
 - AMLP School Parambathu Kavu
 - AMLP School Palakkutty

Privet Sector 

 - KMO Arts & Science Collage, Koduvally
 - KMO Industrial Training Center, Koduvally
 - KMO Teachers Education School, Koduvally
 - KMO Higher Secondary School, Koduvally

References

Municipalities of Kerala

Cities and towns in Kozhikode district